Granby is a town in Hampshire County, Massachusetts, United States. The population was 6,110 at the 2020 census. It is part of the Springfield, Massachusetts Metropolitan Statistical Area. The census-designated place of Granby corresponds to the main village of Granby in the center of the town.

History 
Granby was once part of Hadley, as were other towns. Granby was first settled in 1727 and was officially incorporated in 1768. The town is named in honor of John Manners, Marquess of Granby, a hero of the Seven Years' War. Granby was originally part of the Hadley Equivalent Lands, and then part of South Hadley, before being incorporated on June 11, 1768. Old Hadley was first settled in 1659 by people from Hartford and Wethersfield, Connecticut. These settlers left Connecticut because of religious differences within their communities. John Pynchon was commissioned to buy wilderness land for their new community. Pynchon purchased the land from three Native American chiefs: Chickwallop, Umpanchala and Quonquont. Ownership was transferred to the settlers and confirmed by the General Court. These original boundaries include part of present-day Granby.

Granby is one of only three towns in Massachusetts whose local telephone service is not furnished by the former Bell System as Granby has always maintained its own service, Granby Telephone & Telegraph. The other two such towns are Richmond and Hancock, both in Berkshire County.

Geography

Granby is bordered by South Hadley to the west, Amherst to the north, Belchertown to the east, and Ludlow and Chicopee to the south. Two highways pass through the town: U.S. Route 202 runs eastward though town from South Hadley to Belchertown on East State Street and West State Street, while Route 116 runs northeastward from South Hadley to Amherst along Amherst Road.

The Holyoke Range is in the northern part of Granby. Major peaks within the town are Long Mountain and Mount Norwottuck. The Metacomet-Monadnock Trail runs along this mountain range as it passes through Granby. The Horse Caves are geological ledges along this trail.

Demographics

As of the census of 2000, there were 6,132 people, 2,247 households, and 1,662 families residing in the town. The racial makeup of the town was 96.77% White, 0.51% Black or African American, 0.13% Native American, 0.96% Asian, 0.02% Pacific Islander, 0.52% from other races, and 1.09% from two or more races. Hispanic or Latino of any race were 1.21% of the population.

There were 2,247 households, out of which 34.5% had children under the age of 18 living with them, 62.8% were married couples living together, 8.2% had a female householder with no husband present, and 26.0% were non-families. Of all households, 20.1% were made up of individuals, and 7.9% had someone living alone who was 65 years of age or older.  The average household size was 2.71 and the average family size was 3.15.

In the town, the population was spread out, with 25.5% under the age of 18, 7.0% from 18 to 24, 30.6% from 25 to 44, 25.2% from 45 to 64, and 11.7% who were 65 years of age or older.  The median age was 38 years. For every 100 females, there were 96.0 males.  For every 100 females age 18 and over, there were 94.3 males.

The median income for a household in the town was $54,293, and the median income for a family was $57,632. Males had a median income of $40,833 versus $30,597 for females. The per capita income for the town was $23,209.  About 1.0% of families and 2.2% of the population were below the poverty line, including 2.8% of those under age 18 and 2.0% of those age 65 or over.

Education

Granby has one public elementary school serving K–6, the East Meadow School. Middle/High School students attend Granby Junior-Senior High School.

Points of interest

 Granby Bow & Gun Club
 Cindy’s Drive In

Notable people

 Madeleine Blais, journalist, Pulitzer Prize winner, Zepp's Last Stand
 Charles Burchard, Wisconsin legislator
William Montague Ferry (1796–1867), a Presbyterian minister, missionary, and community leader who founded several settlements in Ottawa County, Michigan
 Abbie E. C. Lathrop (1868–1918), mouse fancier-breeder and accidental early pioneer in genetic research
Zenas Ferry Moody (1832–1917), 7th Governor of the state of Oregon
 Jesse Richards, artist, photographer and filmmaker (remodernist film) and former member of the Stuckism art group

References

External links

 Town of Granby official website
 Granby Public Schools
 Melissa's Guide to Granby, MA
 Granby Bow & Gun Club

 
Springfield metropolitan area, Massachusetts
Towns in Hampshire County, Massachusetts
Towns in Massachusetts